Varyag or Variag may refer to:

Varangians, ancestors of the Rus' sometimes called "Vikings" in English publications
Russian ship Varyag, Russian warships by this name
MP-445 Varyag, a Russian semi-automatic pistol
Variags of Khand, fictional people from J. R. R. Tolkien's legendarium